The 1989 Wyoming's at-large congressional district special election was held April 26, 1989. Incumbent Republican Dick Cheney had resigned to become U.S. Secretary of Defense.

State Representative Craig L. Thomas defeated John Vinich with 52.55% of the vote. This was also the first election that white nationalist William Daniel Johnson ran in.

Results

References

Wyoming
1989
United States House of Representatives
United States House of Representatives 1989
Wyoming 1989 at-large
Wyoming's at-large congressional district special election